Jeffrey L. Edleson is a Distinguished Professor of the Graduate School and the Harry & Riva Specht Chair Emeritus in Publicly Supported Social Services at the University of California, Berkeley, School of Social Welfare. He served a Dean from 2012 to 2019 and was a Professor in the University of Minnesota School of Social Work for 29 years before moving to Berkeley in August 2012. He was also the Founding Director of the Minnesota Center Against Violence and Abuse.  He is one of the world’s leading authorities on children exposed to domestic violence and has published over 120 articles and 12 books on domestic violence, groupwork, and program evaluation.

Life
Edleson is a Phi Beta Kappa graduate of the University of California at Berkeley and received his Masters and Ph.D. in Social Work from the University of Wisconsin–Madison. He has practiced social work in elementary and secondary schools and in several domestic violence agencies worldwide.

He is the co-author with the late Susan Schechter of Effective Intervention in Domestic Violence and Child Maltreatment Cases: Guidelines for Policy and Practice (1999, NCJFCJ).  Better known as the “Greenbook”, this best-practices guide has been the subject of six federally funded and numerous other demonstration sites across America. Prof. Edleson has also conducted intervention research and provided technical assistance to domestic violence programs and research projects across North America as well as in several other countries including Germany, Israel, Cyprus, India, Australia, Korea and Singapore.

He was appointed by U.S. Attorney General Eric Holder to the National Advisory Council on Violence Against Women and also to the U.S. Institute of Medicine's Forum on Global Violence Prevention workshop planning committee. He was a member of the National Academy of Sciences’ Panel on Research on Violence Against Women and a consultant to the National Council of Juvenile and Family Court Judge and the U.S. Centers for Disease Control and Prevention. He is Principal Investigator of the Child Exposure to Domestic Violence Scale  and was the co-Principal Investigator on the Hague Domestic Violence Project that has now moved to the American Bar Association. Prof. Edleson is an Associate Editor of the journal Violence Against Women and has served on numerous editorial boards. He is co-editor of the Oxford University Press book Series on Interpersonal Violence  and the Sage book Series on Violence Against Women.

Selected books
 
 
 
 
  (Domestic Abuse Project)
 
 
 
 
 
  Winner of the 2015 Society for Social Work and Research National Book Award for Best Scholarly Book.
 Renzetti, C.M., Edleson, J.L. & Bergen, R.K. (2018)(Eds.). Sourcebook on violence against women, 3rd Edition. Thousand Oaks, CA: Sage. (1st edition in 2001, 2nd in 2011)

References

External links
http://www.jedleson.com

American social workers
University of Minnesota faculty
Domestic violence academics
Year of birth missing (living people)
Living people
Place of birth missing (living people)
University of California, Berkeley School of Social Welfare faculty